Bruno Henrique da Cunha Baio (born 3 October 1995) is a Brazilian footballer who plays as a forward.

Career
Baio began his career at Internacional. On 23 September 2015, he was first included in a squad for the quarter-final first leg of the year's Copa do Brasil, replacing Wellington for the final 13 minutes of a 1–1 draw against eventual champions Palmeiras at the Beira-Rio. His professional debut came on 28 November, replacing Anderson for the final nine minutes of a 1–1 draw at Fluminense.

References

External links

 

1995 births
Living people
Brazilian footballers
Brazilian expatriate footballers
Brazilian expatriate sportspeople in South Korea
Footballers from São Paulo (state)
Association football forwards
Campeonato Brasileiro Série A players
K League 2 players
Sport Club Internacional players
Criciúma Esporte Clube players
Jeonnam Dragons players
Daejeon Hana Citizen FC players